The Lohan Cura Formation is a geologic formation with outcrops in the Argentine provinces of Río Negro, Neuquén, and Mendoza. It is the second oldest Cretaceous terrestrial formation in the Neuquén Basin.

The Lohan Cura Formation unconformably overlies the terrestrial La Amarga Formation. In some places it also overlies the older marine Agrio and Bajada Colorada Formations of the Mendoza Group through the same Middle Miranican unconformity. It is in turn overlain by the Candeleros Formation of the Neuquén Group, separated by the Main Miranican unconformity. The Lohan Cura correlates with the Rayoso Formation in some areas.

Subdivision 
The Lohan Cura Formation contains two members of roughly equal thickness. The lowest sediments in this unit are conglomerates, overlain by sandstones and siltstones. The upper two-thirds of the member consists mainly of shales.
Near the top of the sequence, siltstones and claystones become dominant.

Fossil content 
Numerous tetrapod fossils have been recovered from the Cullín Grande Member of the Lohan Cura, including:
 several turtles (including 2 species of Prochelidella)
 rebbachisaurid sauropods (including Agustinia and Comahuesaurus)
 Ligabuesaurus

The rebbachisaurid Rayososaurus comes from the correlating Rayoso Formation in this same area.

See also 
 List of dinosaur-bearing rock formations
 Romualdo Formation

References

Bibliography

Further reading 

 J. F. Bonaparte, B. J. González Riga, and S. Apesteguía. 2006. Ligabuesaurus leanzai gen. et sp. nov. (Dinosauria, Sauropoda), a new titanosaur from the Lohan Cura Formation (Aptian, Lower Cretaceous) of Neuquén, Patagonia, Argentina. Cretaceous Research 27:364-376
 J. F. Bonaparte. 1999. An armoured sauropod from the Aptian of northern Patagonia, Argentina. Y. Tomida, T. H. Rich, and P. Vickers-Rich (eds.), Proceedings of the Second Gondwanan Dinosaur Symposium, National Science Museum Monographs 15:1-12
 A. G. Martinelli, A. C. Garrido, A. M. Forasiepi, E. R. Paz, and Y. Gurovich. 2007. Notes on fossil remains from the Early Cretaceous Lohan Cura Formation, Neuquén Province, Argentina. Gondwana Research 11:537-552
 L. Salgado, A. Garrido, S. E. Cocca and J. R. Cocca. 2004. Lower Cretaceous rebbachisaurid sauropods from Cerro Aguada del León (Lohan Cura Formation), Neuquén province, northwestern Patagonia, Argentina. Journal of Vertebrate Paleontology 24(4):903-912

Geologic formations of Argentina
Lower Cretaceous Series of South America
Cretaceous Argentina
Albian Stage
Aptian Stage
Sandstone formations
Siltstone formations
Mudstone formations
Fluvial deposits
Formations
Fossiliferous stratigraphic units of South America
Paleontology in Argentina
Geology of Mendoza Province
Geology of Neuquén Province
Geology of Río Negro Province